Rusholme Rock is the second album by former Stone Roses guitarist Aziz Ibrahim on Indus Records. The album has been licensed through the Italian label 'EGEA Records' in conjunction with 'SAM Productions' and was released on 29 March 2012.

The album features the new line up of Aziz Ibrahim on acoustic guitar/ lead vocals/ sarod and Dalbir Singh Rattan on tabla/ paranth after the departure of Mike Joyce and Andy Rourke formerly of The Smiths.

Ibrahim describes the music on this album as "The Asian Blues". He also states his influences are from his home in the UK, predominantly the eastern culture of Manchester areas like Rusholme and Longsight. Ibrahims' songs vary from social commentary to elaborate instrumentals.

The album features three instrumentals, two of which 'Morassi' and 'Xen And Now' are from their BBC Maida Vale Session in famed Studio 4 recorded and mixed by Guy Worth, where artists such as Jimi Hendrix and Led Zeppelin previously recorded their sessions. Two covers exist, 'I Fought the Law' (originally written by Sonny Curtis of The Crickets in 1959) and 'My Sitar' which is an acoustic/military tabla version of My Star, the top ten chart song written by Ian Brown and Aziz Ibrahim. 'Middle Road' and 'Morassi' originally appeared in their electric versions on the Aziz debut album Lahore to Longsight.

Rusholme Rock was mastered at Abbey Road Studios by Peter Mew. Album cover artwork was designed by the Manchester artist Si Scott.

Personnel
Aziz Ibrahim – lead vocals, acoustic guitar, backing vocals
Dalbir Singh Rattan – tabla, paranth

Track listing

Aziz Ibrahim albums
2012 albums